Veronika Aryana Neugebauer (27 November 1968 – 11 October 2009) was a German actress who specialized in dubbing.

Neugebauer was born in Munich to voice actor Hartmut Neugebauer. She was best known for dubbing Ash Ketchum in the German-Language dub of Pokémon. She has also dubbed Neve Campbell in some of her movies.

Neugebauer died of colorectal cancer on 11 October 2009, aged 40.

Roles

Television animation 
Pokémon (Ash Ketchum (Rica Matsumoto)), Season 4 through Season 11
Sailor Moon (Sailor Jupiter (Emi Shinohara))

Theatrical animation 
Paprika (Doctor Atsuko "Paprika" Chiba (Megumi Hayashibara))
Perfect Blue (Rei (Shiho Niiyama))
Pokémon 4Ever (Ash Ketchum (Rica Matsumoto))
Pokémon Heroes (Ash Ketchum (Rica Matsumoto))
Pokémon: Jirachi Wish Maker (Ash Ketchum (Rica Matsumoto))

Live action 
Big Fish (Mildred (Missi Pyle))
The Blair Witch Project (Heather (Heather Donahue))
DOA: Dead or Alive (Kasumi (Devon Aoki))
Ed Wood (Kathy O'Hara (Patricia Arquette))
Lost & Delirious (Pauline Oster (Piper Perabo))
Men in Black II (Hailey (Colombe Jacobsen-Derstine))
Mr. Deeds (Babe Bennet/Pam Dawson (Winona Ryder))
Panic (Sarah Cassidy (Neve Campbell))
Payback (Pearl (Lucy Liu))
Scream trilogy (Sidney Prescott (Neve Campbell))
Three to Tango (Amy Post (Neve Campbell))
Wild Things (Suzie Marie Toller (Neve Campbell))
Wild Things: Diamonds in the Rough (Marie Clifton (Sarah Laine))

External links 
 German Dubbing Card Index
 
 
 

German voice actresses
Actresses from Munich
1968 births
2009 deaths
Deaths from cancer in Germany
Deaths from colorectal cancer
German women pop singers
20th-century German women singers